France competed at the 2013 World Aquatics Championships in Barcelona, Spain between 19 July and 4 August 2013.

Medalists

Diving

France qualified four quota places for the following diving events:

Men

Women

High diving

France qualified two quota places for the following high diving event. Hassan Mouti was initially entered but did not compete.

Open water swimming

France qualified seven quota places for the following events in open water swimming:

Men

Women

Mixed

Swimming
French swimmers achieved qualifying standards in the following events (up to a maximum of 2 swimmers in each event at the A-standard entry time, and 1 at the B-standard):

Men

Women

Synchronized swimming

France qualified 12 quota places for each of the following synchronized swimming events.

References

External links
Barcelona 2013 Official Site

Nations at the 2013 World Aquatics Championships
2013 in French sport
France at the World Aquatics Championships